This article is a list of lists of some of the 160,000 species of Lepidoptera that are commonly known as moths.

By region 
Lists of Lepidoptera by region

By taxonomy 
Taxonomy of the Lepidoptera
List of Sphingidae species: (hawk moths) a family of moths known for rapid flight
List of geometrid genera
List of Pyralidae genera
List of Tortricidae genera

See also
 :Category:Lists of moths by location